Reginald Beets Smith Jr. (born February 4, 1969) is a Texas politician who currently serves in the Texas House of Representatives from the 62nd district.

Personal life and community involvement
Smith graduated from Austin College with a B.S. in Political Science in 1991, while attending the school he was a member of the Pi Gamma Mu Honor Society. Smith received a degree in law from South Texas College of Law, he then was admitted into the State Bar. He is an attorney. His wife is Stephanie and they have three children together, they are Baptist.

Community service
Smith is an active volunteer in local charitable organizations. He also served on the board of directors of Big Brother Big Sisters, Friends of Scouting with the Texoma Valley Boy Scouts and The Rehab Center. Smith has also coached little league.

Political career
Prior to be elected into the Texas House he served two terms as chairman of the Grayson County Republican Party. He also served on the Northern Regional Director of the Texas Republican County Chairman’s Association. Currently, Smith serves as in the Texas House of Representatives representing District 62. He was sworn in November 19, 2018 succeeding Larry Phillips.

Electoral history

References

21st-century American politicians
Austin College alumni
South Texas College of Law alumni
Living people
Republican Party members of the Texas House of Representatives
1969 births